Kevin Dean Haverdink (born October 20, 1965) is a former American football offensive tackle who played three seasons with the New Orleans Saints of the National Football League. He was drafted by the New Orleans Saints in the fifth round of the 1989 NFL Draft. He played college football at Western Michigan University and attended Hamilton High School in Hamilton, Michigan.

References

External links
Just Sports Stats

Living people
1965 births
Players of American football from Michigan
American football offensive tackles
Western Michigan Broncos football players
New Orleans Saints players
People from Holland, Michigan